Amrokkang station is a freight-only railway station of the Korean State Railway in Hoan, Sup'ung Workers' District, Sakchu County, North P'yŏngan Province, North Korea; it is the terminus of the Amrokkang Line of the Korean State Railway.

History
Amrokkang station, originally called Sup'ung Hoan station, was opened along with the rest of the Amrokkang Line (then called the Sup'ung Hoan Line) by the P'yŏngbuk Railway on 30 September 1940.

References

Railway stations in North Korea